TVSS may refer to::
 Tactile-visual sensory substitution, a device created by Paul Bach
 Total volatile suspended solids, a water quality measure
 Transient voltage surge suppressor